Reception and Identification Centers in Greece, also called a hotspots, are refugee camps for the processing of foreign nationals who come to Greece without the necessary legal formalities. In October 2019, there were a total of six such camps in Greece: five at the islands of the eastern Aegean (Lesbos, Chios, Samos, Leros and Kos) and one at the Fylakio of Evros at the northeastern border of Greece. The total capacity of the five camps on the islands was 6,178 people (the total occupancy was 38,423 people), while the Greek government was planning to create new closed structures with a capacity of 22,000 people. These structures would replace the camps of the islands and would function both as reception and identification centers and as pre-departure centers.

Incidents
In September 2020, a fire at the Moria camp on the island of Lesbos temporarily displaced 12,500 refugees.

Criticisms
In 2019 the New York Times reported that the Samos camp was housing 6000 refugees, equivalent to nine times its maximum capacity. In 2018 Human Rights Watch called the Moria camp on Lesbos an "open air prison".

Planning
In 2021, the Greek Ministry of Migration and Asylum has estimated that they would need a total of 270 million euros for the creation of new or the expansion of the old camps on the islands, while for the expansion of the capacity of a pre-departure center at the Fylakio of Evros, they would require 30 million euros.

References